Try to Remember, is a 2004 mystery television film based on a short story ("The Funniest Thing Has Been Happening Lately") by Mary Higgins Clark that was shot in 2003 on location in Moose Jaw, Saskatchewan, Canada.

Plot
After twelve years of being away, Lisa Monroe returns to her usually quiet hometown of Milford to work as a police detective. She was recruited by her childhood friend, now Lieutenant Joe O'Conner. The first case on which she works as lead investigator is the death of Louise Dexter, her grandmother. Although the autopsy points to the death being accidental, Lisa finds evidence that implicates Jake Mitchell as the murderer. Jake Mitchell raped and killed Lisa's best friend Jenny Rand fifteen years earlier. Jake has been paroled and has returned to Milford to live. At his trial, he vowed revenge on the four people who testified against him, namely Louise, Sergeant Stuart Kling (Lisa's colleague who does not respect her investigative abilities), a security guard named Vinnie DiCampo, and Lisa herself. To some extent, all four feel guilty, but especially Lisa, about not preventing Jenny's death.  The killer is revealed as Fred Rand, Jenny's father, who kills all the people he blames for Jenny's death.

Cast

External links
 

2004 television films
2004 films
American television films
2000s mystery films
American psychological thriller films
Films based on American novels
2004 psychological thriller films
Films shot in Saskatchewan
American mystery films
2000s English-language films
2000s American films